is the sixth Japanese single (counted as fifth) by the South Korean boy band 2PM. It was released on November 14, 2012 in three different editions. The original release day of the single was on August 29, but it was postponed to November 14 due to Nichkhun's car accident controversy.

Background
The initial track list of the single consisted with "Masquerade" and two original Japanese songs, "Stay Here", used as the b-side and "Falling in Love", included as a bonus track. Although, due to Nichkhun's car accident controversy that was surrounding in South Korea affected the single's release by making indefinitely postponed. On October 5, when it was announced that Nichkhun's hiatus ended, a note on 2PM's Japanese website revealed that the single would be released in mid-November with a different track list. On October 15, the jacket covers of the single were re-announced and a new CD track list was revealed. It was also revealed that the original songs that were supposed to be on the single, "Stay Here" and "Falling in Love", will be included in future releases of the group.

Composition
"Masquerade" was written by PA-NON and Michael Yano and composed by NA.ZU.NA and M.I. "Forever", the single's b-side, was written by the member Lee Junho, Shin Bong-won and Mai Watarai. The CD only edition includes a remix version of "Masquerade", remixed by ArmySlick.

Music video
A teaser of the music video was revealed on July 17, 2012 on 2PM's Japanese website. The music video premiered by accident in MTV Japan on August 21. On August 23, MTV Japan apologized for accidentally aired the music video. The music video features the group singing and performing the song in a black studio with white lights on the roof. It also includes solo shots of the members. Taecyeon does not appear in the choreography shots on the music video due to an arm injury.

Editions
The single was released in three different editions: two limited CD+DVD editions and a regular CD only edition:

The limited CD+DVD type A comes with a white jacket cover, the CD single and a special DVD including the music video of "Masquerade" and a dance version of the music video.

The limited CD+DVD type B comes with a black jacket cover, the CD single and a special DVD including the music video of "Masquerade" and an off-shot movie from the recording of the music video.

The regular CD only edition comes with a white jacket cover and the CD only itself. This edition includes a remix of "Masquerade" as a bonus track. All editions include a special trading card, one out of eight different types.

Track listing

Charts

Oricon

Other charts

Release history

References

External links
 Official Website

2012 singles
Dance-pop songs
Japanese-language songs
2PM songs
2012 songs
Ariola Japan singles
Songs written by Michael Yano